Rob Mancini is an Emmy Award-winning American television producer based in Los Angeles. His shows include, Blank Wall Overhaul, Fast N' Loud, Home Made Simple, Street Outlaws, The Dead Files,  and Camp Woodward.

References

Emmy Award winners
American television producers
Living people
Year of birth missing (living people)